Saint-Marcel is a commune in the Savoie department in the Auvergne-Rhône-Alpes region in south-eastern France.  It is home to the MSSA Chemical company sodium factory.

See also
Communes of the Savoie department

References

Communes of Savoie